Major General Sir Peter Henry Scratchley  (24 August 1835 – 2 December 1885) was special commissioner for Great Britain in New Guinea 1884–1885 and defence adviser for Australia.

Biography

Scratchley was born in Paris, thirteenth child of Dr James Scratchley, Royal Artillery, and his wife Maria, née Roberts. He was educated in Paris and at the Woolwich academy and then began a career as an Officer of Engineers in the British Army. Scratchley served in the Crimea and Indian Mutiny and in October 1859 was made a captain. He then had several tours of duty in the Australian colonies advising on defence. In 1860 he was sent to Victoria to plan a system of defence for that colony, but after working on this for over three years his plan was not adopted as a whole. Scratchley had, however, constructed batteries around the coast of Port Phillip by expending a comparatively small sum.

Following the withdrawal in 1870 of British garrison troops from Australia, Major General Sir William Jervois and then Lieutenant Colonel Scratchley were commissioned by a group of colonies to advise on defence matters. They inspected each colony's defences and produced the Jervois-Scratchley reports of 1877. Not surprisingly given their engineering backgrounds and the fear in the colonies of potential enemy fleets, the reports emphasised fortifications against naval attack. The Jervois-Scratchley reports formed the basis of defence planning in Australia and New Zealand for the next 30 years.

Among his achievements in Australia were:
 Founding of the Corps of Engineers in Victoria in 1860
 The fort on Bare Island, Botany Bay, New South Wales
 Fort Scratchley, Newcastle, New South Wales
 Fort Lytton, Brisbane, Queensland
 Fort Glanville, South Australia — assisted by Alexander Bain Moncrieff
 Fort Queenscliff, Queenscliff, Victoria

Scratchley retired with the honorary rank of Major-General on 1 October 1882, but was still employed as defence adviser for Australia by the Colonial Office. He was appointed special commissioner for Great Britain in New Guinea in 1884, and arrived there in August 1885. Port Moresby was made the seat of government, questions of land tenure and the cultivation of the land were examined, and good relations were established with many of the natives and with the missionaries. Scratchley soon contracted malaria and died at sea on aboard the Governor Blackall on 2 December 1885. He was buried in Melbourne and then reinterred to the Old Charlton cemetery in England. He left a widow, two daughters and a son.

Honours
Scratchley was created a Knight Commander of the Order of St Michael and St George in June 1885.

Scratchley Road in Port Moresby, Mount Scratchley in the Owen Stanley Range near Kokoda in Papua New Guinea, and Fort Scratchley in Newcastle are named in his honour.

References

Further reading

1835 births
1885 deaths
History of Papua New Guinea
British Army personnel of the Crimean War
British military personnel of the Indian Rebellion of 1857
Australian engineers
Royal Engineers officers
Knights Commander of the Order of St Michael and St George
Governors of the Territory of Papua